Gymnocarpos is a genus of plants in the family Caryophyllaceae.

Selected species
It contains the following species (but this list may be incomplete):
 Gymnocarpos bracteatus (Balf.f.) Thulin
 Gymnocarpos kuriensis (Radcl.-Sm.) Thulin

References

Caryophyllaceae
Caryophyllaceae genera
Taxonomy articles created by Polbot